Svartis Tunnel is a road tunnel in Meløy, Nordland county, Norway. The tunnel is part of Norwegian County Road 17.

The Svartis Tunnel is closed to pedestrians and cyclists due to the danger of exhaust in the tunnel. The alternative route for cyclists is the ferry between Vassdalsvik and Ørnes. The ferry route was part of County Road 17 prior to the tunnel being opened.

The Svartis Tunnel was Norway's longest road tunnel at the time it was opened. Today it is the fourth-longest tunnel in Nordland county, after Toven Tunnel, Korgfjell Tunnel, and Steigen Tunnel.

This makes it too narrow to have a center line.

Similarly to many other tunnels in Norway, the Svartis Tunnel is plagued by condensation. This can lead to dangerous situations when vehicles' windshields suddenly fog when entering a tunnel.

See also 

 List of tunnels in Norway
 List of subsea tunnels in Norway

References 

1986 establishments in Norway
Norwegian County Road 17
Tunnels completed in 1986
Road tunnels in Nordland